Kinross is a surname of Scottish origin. Notable people with the surname include:

Albert Kinross (1870–1929), English writer
Cecil John Kinross (1896–1957), Canadian Victoria Cross recipient
Nan Kinross (1926–2021), New Zealand nurse and nursing academic
Patrick Balfour, 3rd Baron Kinross (1904–1976), writer and historian, biographer of Mustafa Kemal Atatürk

References

Scottish toponymic surnames